Khiprianwala Island is a small island located in the Arabian Sea off the coast of Karachi, Sindh, Pakistan.

See also
 List of islands of Pakistan

References

Neighbourhoods of Karachi
Islands of Karachi
Islands of Sindh